The following highways are numbered 188:

India
State Highway 188 (Andhra Pradesh)

Japan
 Japan National Route 188

United States
 Alabama State Route 188
 Arizona State Route 188
 California State Route 188
 Connecticut Route 188
 Florida State Road 188
 Georgia State Route 188
 Iowa Highway 188
 K-188 (Kansas highway)
 Kentucky Route 188
 Maine State Route 188
 Maryland Route 188
 M-188 (Michigan highway)
 New Mexico State Road 188
 New York State Route 188 (former)
 Ohio State Route 188
 Pennsylvania Route 188
 South Carolina Highway 188
 Tennessee State Route 188
 Texas State Highway 188
 Texas State Highway Spur 188
 Farm to Market Road 188 (Texas)
 Urban Road 188 (Texas, signed as Farm to Market Road 188)
 Utah State Route 188 (former)
 Virginia State Route 188
 Wisconsin Highway 188
Territories
 Puerto Rico Highway 188